Taurus Mountain is a mountain summit located in British Columbia, Canada.

Description
Taurus Mountain is a 2,972-meter-elevation (9,751-foot) peak situated 12 kilometers (7.5 miles) southeast of The Bugaboos, in the Purcell Mountains which are a subrange of the Columbia Mountains. Precipitation runoff from Taurus Mountain drains southwest into the headwaters of Howser Creek thence Duncan Lake; and from the north slope into headwaters of Frances Creek and eventually the Columbia River. Topographic relief is significant as the summit rises over 1,280 meters (4,200 feet) above Frances Creek in two kilometers (1.24 mile).

History
The name Taurus was applied to the mountain by Arthur O. Wheeler during his survey trip across Bugaboo Pass in 1910. Conrad Kain said that Wheeler called the mountain Taurus "because it was like a bull." From the Bugaboo region its general appearance suggests a formidable bull. The mountain's toponym was officially adopted June 9, 1960, by the Geographical Names Board of Canada.

The first ascent of the summit was made July 28, 1946, by Edward F. Little, Eugen Rosenstock-Huessy and Alex Fabergé.

The second ascent was made August 1, 1952, by three members of the Dartmouth Mountaineering Club: Peter Robinson, Bob Collins and Bill Briggs.

Climate

Based on the Köppen climate classification, Taurus Mountain is located in a subarctic climate zone with cold, snowy winters, and mild summers. Temperatures in winter can drop below −20 °C with wind chill factors below −30 °C. This climate supports unnamed glaciers on the mountain's slopes.

See also
 Geography of British Columbia
 Purcell Supergroup

References

External links
 Taurus Mountain: weather forecast
 Taurus Mountain (photo): Flickr
 Account of the first ascent

Purcell Mountains
Two-thousanders of British Columbia
Kootenay Land District